Andronicus or Andronikos is a classical Greek name. The name has the sense of "male victor, warrior". Its female counterpart is Andronikè (Ἀνδρονίκη). Notable bearers of the name include:

People
Andronicus of Olynthus, Greek general under Demetrius in the 4th century BC
Livius Andronicus ( 284–204 BC), Greco-Roman dramatist and epic poet who introduced drama to the Romans and produced the first formal play in Latin in c. 240 BC
Andronicus ben Meshullam, Jewish scholar of the 2nd century BC
Andronicus of Pergamum, 2nd-century BC diplomat
Andronicus of Macedonia, Macedonian governor of Ephesus in 2nd century BC
Andronicus of Cyrrhus (fl. c. 100 BC), Greek astronomer
Andronicus of Rhodes (fl. c. 60 BC), Greek philosopher
Andronicus of Pannonia (Saint Andronicus), Christian Apostle of the Seventy mentioned in Romans 16:7
Andronicus (physician), Greek physician of the 2nd century
Andronicus (poet), Greek writer of the 4th century
Saint Andronicus, 4th-century Christian martyr
Andronicus of Alexandria, soldier, martyr, saint and companion of Faustus, Abibus and Dionysius of Alexandria
Coptic Pope Andronicus of Alexandria (reigned 616–622)
Andronikos I Komnenos (1118–1185), Byzantine emperor
Andronikos II Palaiologos (1258–1332)
Andronikos III Palaiologos (1297–1341)
Andronikos IV Palaiologos (1348–1385)
Andronikos V Palaiologos ( 1400– 1407), co-emperor with his father, John VII Palaiologos
Andronikos Palaiologos, Lord of Thessalonike (1403–1429)
Andronikos I of Trebizond (?-1235), emperor of Trebizond
Andronikos II of Trebizond ( 1240–1266)
Andronikos III of Trebizond ( 1310–1332)
 Andronicus of Veszprém, 13th-century Hungarian cleric

Fictional characters
Titus Andronicus, play by William Shakespeare, possibly inspired by one of the above-listed emperors
Andronicus, or the Unfortunate Politician, 1646 satire by Thomas Fuller

See also
Andronikos Komnenos (disambiguation)
Andronikos Palaiologos (disambiguation)